Comedy Is Not Pretty! (1979) is an album by the American comedian Steve Martin. It was recorded at The Boarding House in San Francisco, California, where his previous two albums were also recorded.

When released, the album was not as well-received as his previous two albums (Let's Get Small, A Wild and Crazy Guy). However, at this point in his career, Martin was in the midst of writing the screenplay for his first starring role in the motion picture, The Jerk. As a result, he spent less of his time working on material for his stand-up career and the album was his first to not make the Top 10 on Billboard's Pop Albums Chart, peaking only at #25. The album was also his first to not go Platinum; it was, however, certified Gold.

One track was simply a humorous reading of a short story from his book Cruel Shoes accompanied by a banjo solo in the background. The track "Drop Thumb Medley" is an instrumental banjo performance.

This album was nominated for a Grammy Award for Best Comedy Album.

Martin also starred in a television special of the same name for NBC in 1980.

Track listing 
All tracks by Steve Martin

"Born to Be Wild" (Mars Bonfire, Martin) – 5:49
"The All Being" – 1:24
"McDonald's/Men's Underwear" – 3:11
"Drop Thumb Medley" – 2:10
"Googlephonics" – 3:06
"Hostages" – 1:13
"Cruel Shoes" – 2:17
"Comedy Is Not Pretty" – 3:26
"How to Meet a Girl" – 3:47
"Rubberhead" – 0:56
"Jackie O. and Farrah F." – 3:39
"You Can Be a Millionaire" – 2:55

Personnel 

William R. Eastabrook – Photography
Pat Kraus – Digital Mastering
Steve Martin – Composer
William McEuen – Producer, Engineer, Artwork, Editing, Art Direction, Design
Norman Seeff – Photography
Geoff Sykes – Mastering
Dean Torrence – Graphic Design

References

External links

1979 live albums
Steve Martin albums
Warner Records live albums
Albums with cover art by Dean Torrence
1970s comedy albums
Live comedy albums
Comedy albums by American artists
Stand-up comedy albums